Francis Brown (born February 3, 1982) is an American football coach and former cornerback. He is the defensive backs coach at Georgia.

Early life
Raised in Camden, New Jersey, Brown graduated from Camden High School, where he set the school record as a quarterback with 47 touchdown passes.

Playing career
Following his high school career, Brown switched to cornerback at Western Carolina and became a first-team All-SoCon selection and team captain. Following his time as a Catamount, Brown spent time with the Cincinnati Bengals during the 2007 and 2008 seasons.

Coaching career

Temple
After spending a year coaching at Paul VI Catholic High School, Brown joined Steve Addazio's staff at Temple as the Assistant Director of Internal Operations in 2011. During the 2012 season, Brown transitioned to a graduate assistant role in 2012 before becoming Temple's defensive backs coach on Matt Rhule's staff in 2013. Brown held that role until 2016, when he was added associate head coach responsibilities to his job description.

After the 2014 recruiting season, in which he signed a number of players including future pro Sean Chandler, Brown was named a top recruiter in the American Athletic Conference by Rivals.com.

Baylor
Brown followed Rhule to Baylor where he served as the Bears' assistant head coach and defensive backs coach for the 2017 and 2018 seasons. During his time in Waco, Brown was considered Baylor's top recruiter.

Second Stint at Temple
Following the 2018 season, Brown interviewed for the head coaching job at Temple that eventually went to Manny Diaz. Diaz's first hire at Temple was to bring Brown in as assistant head coach and co-defensive coordinator. After 17 days, Diaz left Temple to return to Miami for the head coaching job. Brown interviewed for the Temple head coaching job, but it eventually went to Rod Carey. Carey kept Brown on the Temple Owl's coaching staff as the co-defensive coordinator.

Rutgers
After Rutgers brought back coach Greg Schiano for the  2020 season, he hired Brown to be the team’s secondary coach

Georgia
On February 18, 2022, Brown was hired to be a part of Georgia’s defensive staff. Brown was hired to replace Jahmile Addae who took the same position at Miami (FL) on Feb. 7. He was part of the coaching staff on the Georgia team that defeated TCU in the National Championship.

Personal

References

External links
 Temple profile

1982 births
Living people
African-American coaches of American football
African-American players of American football
American football cornerbacks
American football offensive guards
American football quarterbacks
Baylor Bears football coaches
Camden High School (New Jersey) alumni
Cincinnati Bengals players
High school football coaches in Virginia
Players of American football from Camden, New Jersey
Rutgers Scarlet Knights football coaches
Sportspeople from Camden, New Jersey
Temple Owls football coaches
Western Carolina Catamounts football players
21st-century African-American sportspeople
20th-century African-American people